Edward Dufner (1872 - October 1, 1957) was an American painter and art teacher.

Life
Dufner was born in 1872 in Buffalo, New York. He attended the Art Students League of New York, the Académie Julian, and the Académie Carmen.

Dufner taught at the Art Students League of Buffalo and New York, the Carnegie Institute of Technology, and the Traphagen School of Fashion. He became an Impressionist painter, and he won the Pennsylvania Academy of Fine Arts's Walter Lippincott Prize in 1924.

Dufner married Fern Bradley. He died on October 1, 1957, at age 86, and he was buried in Beaufort, South Carolina.

References

1872 births
1957 deaths
Artists from Buffalo, New York
Art Students League of New York alumni
Académie Julian alumni
Painters from New York City
American male painters
American Impressionist painters
19th-century American painters
20th-century American painters
19th-century American male artists
20th-century American male artists